Protorhus is a small genus of Afrotropical trees in the family Anacardiaceae. It is dioecious, with male and female flowers on separate plants.

Taxonomy

Protorhus is placed in tribe Rhoeae, subfamily Anacardioideae of the family Anacardiaceae. The genus Abrahamia with 19 Madagascan taxa was separated from Protorhus in 2004.(Pell 2004)

Species
The species are: 
 Protorhus fulva Engl. – Madagascar
 Protorhus longifolia (Bernh.) Engl. – South Africa
 Protorhus thouarsii 

Formerly listed;
 Protorhus buxifolia H. Perrier, transferred to Abrahamia buxifolia (H. Perrier) Randrian. & Lowry

References

Bibliography
 

 
Anacardiaceae genera
Dioecious plants